The Honolulu International Airport Station is an under-construction  rapid transit station along Ala Auana Street serving the Daniel K. Inouye International Airport along the Honolulu Rail Transit line in Honolulu, Hawaii. It is part of the third HART segment, scheduled to open in 2031.

Station information 

The station will be built between the overseas and international parking structures, and it will feature ADA pedestrian access, bicycle parking, elevators and stairs to connect with the platforms, pedestrian bridges and walkways to connect with the airport terminals, restrooms, and bus connections.

The Hawaiian Station Name Working Group proposed Hawaiian names for the twelve rail stations on the eastern end of the rail system (stations in the Airport and City Center segments) in April 2019. The proposed name for this station, Lelepaua, means the choice mother of pearl inside the pāua bivalve and refers to a large fishpond and salt production area built by Kaʻihikapu Manuia.

Travel time 
 26 minutes to East Kapolei Station
 5 minutes to Aloha Stadium Station
 12 minutes to Downtown Station
 16 Minutes to Ala Moana Center Station

Station layout

External links 

 Honolulu International Airport HART Station
 Video of Station Site

References 

Transportation in Honolulu
Honolulu Rail Transit stations
Buildings and structures in Honolulu
Daniel K. Inouye International Airport
Airport railway stations in the United States
Railway stations scheduled to open in 2031